Chen Bao-ji (born 10 November 1953) is a Taiwanese politician. He served as the Minister of Council of Agriculture from 6 February 2012 to 31 January 2016.

Education
Chen obtained his bachelor's and master's degrees in animal husbandry from National Taiwan University in 1975 and 1977, respectively. He then obtained his doctoral degree in animal nutrition from Cornell University in the United States in 1989.

Council of Agriculture

2013 H7N9 flu virus outbreak

In end of April 2013, during the H7N9 flu virus outbreak, Chen encouraged vendors offering live poultry slaughtering at traditional markets to sign contracts with legal slaughterhouses and change their selling practices. Customers were also advised to purchase meat products processed by legal slaughterhouses. He said that the ROC government would reimburse poultry sellers for any birds culled for carrying the virus.

During an event held by the Poultry Association of the Republic of China in early May 2013, Chen said that food processing practice in Taiwan conformed with international standards, from feeding to slaughtering and shipping, and that he also guaranteed the food safety of all of the local chickens. He himself, accompanied by Health Minister Wen-ta Chiu, ate chicken during the event to promote the sale of Taiwan poultry products.

See also
 Agriculture in Taiwan

References

1953 births
Living people
Taiwanese Ministers of Agriculture
Cornell University College of Agriculture and Life Sciences alumni
National Taiwan University alumni